The Bombay Rock is a rock music venue located on Sydney Road, Brunswick, Victoria, Australia, which originally ran from 1977 until it was destroyed by a fire in 1991. The venue had previously been located in Bourke Street in the city under the name of the Bombay Bicycle Club. Operated by Joe Gualtieri, it was described in the 1980s as "…an old style rock barn … with all the style and grace of a converted factory" and was to the working class, what Billboard was to the Middle Class. 

The Bombay rock was then renowned for both the range of important Australian bands that performed there, and the regular violent fights among its patrons, with hardly a night going by without a fight. Australian Photographer Rennie Ellis captured a number of performers at the venue in the 1980s, including Jo Jo Zep & The Falcons, Other bands to play there included INXS, Australian Crawl, The Angels, Cold Chisel, XTC, The Sunnyboys, Flowers, JAB, The Church, Kevin Borich, The Sports, Lonely Hearts, Sherbet, The Zorros, Dave Warner's From the Suburbs and Skyhooks. Once established, Bombay rock also hosted a number of international acts including Eric Burdon, Steppenwolf, The Knack, Bo Diddley, Boomtown Rats, and New Zealand band, Mi Sex.

The album: Stars: Live At Bombay Rock, was recorded at Bombay Rock on 18 October 1979. Nick Cave performed several times in the late 1970s with his band The Boys Next Door.

Dave Warner's band From the Suburbs recorded the album Free Kicks at Bombay Rock in November 1978.

The Bombay Rock features in the film Death in Brunswick, representing itself as a dangerous and sleazy music venue. 
Ray Argall's film The Models includes footage of the Bombay Rock.

The track Beautiful People (1979) by Australian Crawl includes a reference to the Bombay Rock night club in Brunswick.

It was frequented by some famous gangland identities including Judy Moran and Alphonse Gangitano.

Following reconstruction after the fire, the building retained its 19th-century facade, and became the site of the Beach Nightclub, eventually closing.

In May 2018 EMS have decided to breathe some new life into the venue under the management of Asher Trainor and Kacey Knoodle. Trading back under the Bombay Rock name They aim to stick to the roots as much as possible with live music every Friday and Saturday, cheap drinks and parties till late. Under this iteration of the bands such as Australian Kingswood Factory, Muscle Car, Sforzando, Strawberry Fist Cake, Ferocious Chode, Murder Rats, Riot After Midnight, Parmy Dhillon & the New Science, Lace & Whiskey and Wolfpack. 

Post the COVID 19 pandemic, in 2021 new venue management and bookers were tasked with revitalising the offering into a late night Dance Club. Venue entertainment direction has been managed by long time Melbourne music industry stalwart Dave 'Chestwig' Separvic and club royalty, DJ Post Percy and DJ Muska.

References

External links
Bombay Rock
Facebook page

1977 establishments in Australia
1991 disestablishments in Australia
Music venues in Melbourne
Defunct nightclubs in Australia
Nightclubs in Melbourne